Carabus marietti bischoffi is a subspecies of ground beetle from Carabinae subfamily that is endemic to Turkey. The subspecies are either brown or green coloured.

References

marietti necopinatus
Beetles described in 1986
Endemic fauna of Turkey